Arturo Gallea (18 September 1895 – 21 September 1959) was an Italian cinematographer and producer.

Born in Turin, Gallea entered the industry of cinema in 1911 as a film producer. He began his career as a cinematographer in the mid-1910s and,  in 1952, won the Nastro d'Argento for best cinematography for his work in Renato Castellani's Two Cents Worth of Hope. Gallea died in a car accident in 1959.

Selected filmography 

La crociata degli innocenti   (1916)
 The Cry of the Eagle (1923)
Nini Falpala (1933)
 The Matchmaker (1934)
 Creatures of the Night (1934)
 The Blind Woman of Sorrento (1934)
Don Bosco   (1935)
The Man Who Smiles   (1936)
 God's Will Be Done (1936)
 Adam's Tree (1936)
Music in the Square (1936)
 The Two Sergeants (1936)
Triumph of Love   (1938)
The Lady in White   (1938)
Marionette   (1938)
Under the Southern Cross   (1938)
 Defendant, Stand Up! (1939)
 The Document (1939)
At Your Orders, Madame   (1939)
We Were Seven Sisters   (1939)
 Wealth Without a Future (1939)
 It Always Ends That Way (1939)
 A Romantic Adventure (1940)
Piccolo mondo antico   (1941)
 The Last Dance (1941)
 The Man on the Street  (1941)
 Light in the Darkness (1941)
 The Queen of Navarre (1942)
 Disturbance (1942)
 Jealousy (1942)
Love Story   (1942)
 The Materassi Sisters (1944)
 The Priest's Hat (1944)
Lo sbaglio di essere vivo   (1945)
Il mondo vuole così   (1946)
 The Unknown Man of San Marino (1946)
 Fire Over the Sea (1947)
 The Lady of the Camellias (1947)
 William Tell (1949)
 The Legend of Faust (1949)
 Mistress of the Mountains (1950)
Volcano  (1950)
 Captain Demonio (1950)
Two Cents Worth of Hope  (1952)
The White Sheik  (1952)
 Son of the Hunchback (1952)
Bread, Love and Dreams   (1953)
 The Merchant of Venice (1953)
Bread, Love and Jealousy   (1954)
 The King's Prisoner (1954)
 Orphan of the Ghetto (1954)
The Widow   (1955)
I pappagalli   (1955)
The Belle of Rome   (1955)
 The Angel of the Alps (1957)
Valeria ragazza poco seria   (1958)

References

External links 

1895 births
1959 deaths
Italian cinematographers
Film people from Turin
Nastro d'Argento winners
Road incident deaths in Italy